Yoo Sang-Soo  (born 28 August 1973) is a South Korean football coach and retired player who played as a defender. He participated in Summer Universiade in 1995.

References

External links 

1973 births
Living people
Association football defenders
South Korean footballers
Jeju United FC players
FC Seoul players
Jeonnam Dragons players
Ulsan Hyundai Mipo Dockyard FC players
K League 1 players
People from Chuncheon
Sportspeople from Gangwon Province, South Korea